Bazaar Rowdy is a 1988 Indian Telugu-language action drama film directed by A. Kodandarami Reddy. It stars Ramesh Babu, Nadhiya, Gautami, Seetha, Mahesh Babu. The film was produced by U. Suryanarayana Babu under the Padmavathi Films banner and was presented by Krishna. 

Music of the film was composed by Raj–Koti. Until this film, Kodandarami Reddy has collaborated only with K. Chakravarthy and Ilaiyaraaja as music composers. The film also marked the Telugu debut of actress, Nadhiya.

Cast

Ramesh Babu as Ranjeeth 
Nadhiya as Sirisha & Sarika (Dual role) 
Gautami as Manga
Seetha as Lalitha 
Mahesh Babu as Mahesh
Satyanarayana as Ahobala Rao 
Allu Ramalingaiah as Ambhujam's father 
Prabhakar Reddy as Bhanoji Rao 
Subhalekha Sudhakar as Mohan 
Pradeep Shakti as CBI Officer Pradeep
Kota Srinivasa Rao as Bujji Pandu
Ramana Murthy as Master 
P. J. Sarma as Dr. Sundara Murthy 
Bhimiswara Rao as Sirisha's father 
Jaya Bhaskar as Inspector
Telephone Satyanarayana as Governor 
Shubha as Lawyer 
Kalpana Rai as Rangamma 
Y. Vijaya as Ambhujam
Nirmalamma as Parvathamma

Special Appearance
Krishna as himself
Radha as herself

Soundtrack

Music composed by Raj–Koti. Lyrics were written by Veturi. Music released on Cauvery Audio Company.

References

Indian action drama films
Films directed by A. Kodandarami Reddy
Films scored by Raj–Koti
1980s Telugu-language films
1980s action drama films
1988 drama films
1988 films